These are the official results of the Women's Individual Road Race at the 1996 Summer Olympics in Atlanta, Georgia, held on July 21, 1996. There were 58 participants in the race over 104 km, with fifteen cyclists who did not finish.

Final classification

See also
 Men's Individual Road Race

References

External links
 Official Report

R
Cycling at the Summer Olympics – Women's road race
1996 in women's road cycling
Cyc